WPRO-FM (92.3 MHz "92 PRO-FM") is a commercial top 40 (CHR) radio station in Providence, Rhode Island, United States, owned by Cumulus Media.  
 
The studios and offices are located in the Brine Broadcasting Center on Wampanoag Trail on the East Providence–Barrington line.  The transmitter is located on Neuticonacanut Hill in Johnston, Rhode Island.

History
Cherry & Webb Broadcasting Company, owners of WPRO (630 AM), applied for a construction permit for a new high frequency broadcasting station on 47.5 MHz on October 29, 1940. An amended application was filed January 15, 1941, and was finally granted by the Federal Communications Commission (FCC) on June 12, 1947, with its new frequency of 92.3 MHz in the new FM band. WPRO-FM began broadcasting on April 17, 1948. The Cherry & Webb Broadcasting Company, in turn, was owned by the Cherry & Webb Department Store. (In the early days of broadcasting, it was common for department stores to own radio stations, to provide programming for customers who bought receivers.)  At first, WPRO-FM simulcast its AM sister station, WPRO. In 1959, Capital Cities Communications acquired both WPRO and WPRO-FM.  Through the 1960s and early 1970s, WPRO-FM aired a beautiful music format, while WPRO AM enjoyed high ratings with a top 40 format.

On April 29, 1974, at 3:00 p.m., WPRO-FM changed formats from easy listening, joining its AM counterpart as a top 40 outlet.  Over time, the AM moved toward an adult top 40 direction, adding more information and service features, while WPRO-FM continued as a music-intensive top 40 outlet. Capital Cities and ABC merged in 1985, and WPRO-AM-FM were then under the ownership of one of America's biggest broadcasting companies.

In December 1992, Capital Cities/ABC announced that the stations would be sold to Tele-Media, with the sale being consummated the following April. This put the station under common ownership with WLKW (the former WEAN) and WWLI. Tele-Media, in turn, sold its stations to Citadel Broadcasting in 1997. Citadel merged with Cumulus Media on September 16, 2011.

WPRO-FM is unique in the Providence media market in keeping the same call sign since its sign-on in 1948; and the same format, top 40, since 1974.

Notable WPRO-FM alumni
Gary Berkowitz - WPRO's first program director under the Top 40 format
Rocky Allen
Bruce Diamond
Tom Cuddy
Howard Hoffman
Tony Bristol
David Simpson
Jimmy Gray
Big John Bina
Vic Michaels
Don Geronimo
Tony Mascaro
Will Gilbert
Tanya Cruise
Davey Morris

References

External links
92 Pro FM
92 PRO FM On-Air Playlist
92 Pro FM's Official Myspace
Audio of WPRO-FM on this page from 1959 simulcasting WPRO/630 & in 1976 as Top 40 "FM92"

PRO-FM
Contemporary hit radio stations in the United States
Cumulus Media radio stations
Radio stations established in 1948
1948 establishments in Rhode Island